Lightspeed Systems is a company based in Austin, Texas that builds and sells SaaS content-control software, mobile device management, alert software, and classroom management software to K–12 schools.

History
Founded in 1999 in Bakersfield, California, Lightspeed Systems, Inc., develops content filtering, mobile device management, and device monitoring software targeted to the education market. It is headquartered in Austin, Texas with an office in Brentwood, Essex (United Kingdom). The company has about 200 employees. In 2012, Inc.com ranked the company #1855 out of the Inc 5000. However, Inc.com did not list the company as part of the Inc 5000 after 2012. In 2019, Lightspeed Systems received an investment from Madison Dearborn Partners. In January 2022, they acquired CatchOn, a real-time data analytics provider that helps with student engagement, and in March, Lightspeed received another investment from Genstar Capital.

Products

Mobile Device Management 
In 2013, Lightspeed introduced mobile device management. Mobile device management helps school IT staff to manage school devices more easily through the use of policies.

Filter 
In 2017, Lightspeed announced the Relay Filter, which was then renamed to just Lightspeed Filter. Lightspeed Systems advertises their Filter product as blocking "inappropriate" content, and a tool for CIPA compliance. It originally was only supported on Chromebooks. However in 2018 support for Mac OS, iOS, and Windows was announced.

Classroom Management 
In April 2018, Lightspeed released Classroom, classroom management software which the company claims can monitor and control content loaded on devices used by students during class.

Analytics 
In March 2019, Lightspeed Systems released Analytics for reporting on apps, applications, and web sites used on school owned devices.

Alert 
In 2021 Lightspeed announced Alert, a product the company says uses AI and human review to identify threats of school violence or student self-harm.

Criticism 
Lightspeed Systems has been criticized by students for the amount of content blocked by the system. There have also been privacy concerns brought up by many students.

In 2012, Darryl LaGacé, head of IT in San Diego Unified School District, left to go work for Lightspeed Systems after previously procuring a $375,000 contract with them earlier that year. This brought up many concerns and scrutiny.

In 2012, Lightspeed Systems raised questionable behavior when directly mass emailing customers accounts to poach from partner accounts.

See also
Windows Live Family Safety

References

1999 establishments in California
Companies based in Bakersfield, California
Education companies established in 1999
Content-control software
Internet safety
Software companies based in California
Software companies of the United States
Software companies established in 1999